Anton Ivashkin (born 14 April 1996 in Minsk) is a Belarusian cyclist, who most recently rode for UCI Continental team .

Major results
2014
1st Stage 2 Coupe du Président de la Ville de Grudziądz
2016
3rd Minsk Cup
2017
2nd Road race, National Road Championships
3rd Overall Tour de Serbie

References

External links

1996 births
Living people
Belarusian male cyclists